This is a list of notable events in country music that took place in 2018.

Events
 January – The critically acclaimed ABC/CMT series Nashville announces it will stop production after its sixth season which premiered on January 4, 2018. The show's last episode aired on July 26, 2018.
 January 17 – Kenny Chesney announces that he has left Sony Music Nashville after 23 years and has subsequently signed with Warner Bros. Records Nashville.
 February 2 – Montgomery Gentry release their final album together, Here's to You, following the death of Troy Gentry in September 2017.
 April 15 – The Academy of Country Music awards return to Las Vegas for the first time since the October 2017 Las Vegas shooting, with Reba McEntire returning as host; Carrie Underwood makes her comeback performance after months out of the public eye while recovering from injuries she suffered in a fall at home.
 April 30 – USA Network announces Real Country, a reality competition show designed to find the next big country star and featuring Travis Tritt, Jake Owen and Shania Twain as judges.
 June 8 – Sugarland returns with the release of their first album together since 2010, Bigger.
 June 25 – Fox announces it will air "iHeartCountry Festival", featuring headliners Luke Bryan, Keith Urban, and more in August.
 June 26 – Dolly Parton, Emmylou Harris, Linda Ronstadt, and Faith Hill are announced to receive stars on the Hollywood Walk of Fame in 2019.
 July 25 – Reba McEntire is announced as one of the recipients of the 2018 Kennedy Center Honors.
 August 8 – Carrie Underwood announces her pregnancy with her second child.
 September 20 – Carrie Underwood receives her star on the Hollywood Walk of Fame.
 November 20 – Jimmie Allen reaches number one on Country Airplay with "Best Shot", making him the first African American to send a debut single to the top of that chart.

Top hits of the year 
The following songs placed within the Top 20 on the Hot Country Songs, Country Airplay, or Canada Country charts in 2018:

Singles released by American and Australian artists

Singles released by Canadian artists

Notes 
 "—" denotes releases that did not chart
 A^ Current singles.

Top new album releases 
The following albums placed on the Top Country Albums charts in 2018:

Other top albums

Deaths
 January 2 – Rick Hall, 85, record producer and owner of FAME Studios
 January 23 – Lari White, 52, singer-songwriter and actress best known for the hit "Now I Know" (advanced peritoneal cancer).
 February 12 – Daryle Singletary, 46, neotraditionalist singer-songwriter with hits including "I Let Her Lie", "Amen Kind of Love" and "Too Much Fun". (blood clot)
 February 25 – Bruce Nelson Stratton, 74, American radio personality (throat cancer).
 March 2 – Ronnie Prophet, 80, Canadian country music singer (multiple organ failure).
 March 18 – Hazel Smith, 83, American country music journalist, publicist and songwriter; first to coin the phrase "outlaw" in relation to country music.
 March 27 – Kenny O'Dell, 73, American country singer-songwriter ("Behind Closed Doors", "Lizzie and the Rainman", "Mama He's Crazy"), Grammy winner (1974).
 April 17 – Tom McBride, 81, Irish country star and lead singer of Big Tom and The Mainliners.
 April 18 – Randy Scruggs, 64, multiple Grammy-winning songwriter and guitarist; son of Earl Scruggs.
 June 2 – Wayne Secrest, 68, bassist for Confederate Railroad
 June 5 – Billy ThunderKloud, 70, Native American country music singer. (complications from stroke and pneumonia).
 October 27 – Freddie Hart, 91, singer-songwriter ("Easy Loving", "My Hang-Up Is You", "Trip to Heaven", "Hang In There Girl") (pneumonia).
 November 1 – Dave Rowland, 74, lead singer of Dave & Sugar (stroke).
 November 15 – Roy Clark, 85, country music singer, musician and host of Hee Haw (complications from pneumonia).
 December 15 – Jerry Chesnut, 87, songwriter ("It's Four in the Morning", "T-R-O-U-B-L-E")
 December 22 – Jimmy Work, 94, American country singer-songwriter ("Making Believe").
 December 31 – Ray Sawyer, 81, American country singer Dr. Hook & the Medicine Show (short illness).

Hall of Fame inductees

Bluegrass Hall of Fame 
 Tom T. Hall and Dixie Hall
 Ricky Skaggs
 Paul Williams

Country Music Hall of Fame inductees 
 Ricky Skaggs, bluegrass-influenced-and-styled singer-songwriter-musician and leading figure in the neotraditionalist movement of the 1980s onward (born 1954).
 Dottie West, leading singer of the 1960s and early 1970s, enjoyed pop-styled resurgence in late 1970s and early 1980s (1932–1991).
 Johnny Gimble, Western swing-styled musician and member of Bob Wills' Texas Playboys (1926–2015).

Canadian Country Music Hall of Fame inductees 
 Terri Clark, singer (born 1968)
 Jackie Rae Greening, broadcaster

Major awards

Academy of Country Music 
(presented in Las Vegas on April 7, 2019)
 Entertainer of the Year – Keith Urban
 Male Vocalist of the Year – Thomas Rhett
 Female Vocalist of the Year – Kacey Musgraves
 Vocal Duo of the Year – Dan + Shay
 Vocal Group of the Year – Old Dominion
 New Male Vocalist of the Year – Luke Combs
 New Female Vocalist of the Year – Ashley McBryde
 New Vocal Duo/Group of the Year – Lanco
 Songwriter of the Year – Shane McAnally
 Album of the Year – Golden Hour (Kacey Musgraves)
 Single of the Year – "Tequila" (Dan + Shay)
 Song of the Year – "Tequila" (Nicolle Galyon, Jordan Reynolds Dan Smyers)
 Vocal Event of the Year – "Burning Man" (Dierks Bentley featuring Brothers Osborne
 Video of the Year – "Drunk Girl" (Chris Janson)
 Artist of the Decade – Jason Aldean

ACM Honors 
(presented August 22 in Nashville)
 Cliffie Stone Icon Award – Alan Jackson
 Merle Haggard Spirit Award – Dierks Bentley
 Mae Boren Axton Award – Mickey Christensen, Chris Christensen and Eddie Miller
 Poet's Award – Matraca Berg and Norro Wilson
 Gary Haber Lifting Lives Award – Darius Rucker
 Gene Weed Milestone Award – Sam Hunt
 Songwriter of the Year – Rhett Akins
 Producer of the Year – Dave Cobb
 Jim Reeves International Award – Rob Potts

Americana Music Honors & Awards 
(presented on September 12, 2018)
 Album of the Year – The Nashville Sound (Jason Isbell)
 Artist of the Year – John Prine
 Duo/Group of the Year – Jason Isbell and the 400 Unit
 Song of the Year – "If We Were Vampires" (Jason Isbell)
 Emerging Artist of the Year – Tyler Childers
 Instrumentalist of the Year – Molly Tuttle
 Spirit of Americana/Free Speech Award – Rosanne Cash
 Lifetime Achievement: Trailblazer – k.d. lang
 Lifetime Achievement: Performance – Irma Thomas
 Lifetime Achievement: Instrumentalist – Buddy Guy
 Lifetime Achievement: Executive – Judy Dlugacz and Cris Williamson

American Music Awards 
(presented in Los Angeles on October 9, 2018)
 Favorite Male Artist – Kane Brown
 Favorite Female Artist – Carrie Underwood
 Favorite Group or Duo – Florida Georgia Line
 Favorite Album – Kane Brown (Kane Brown)
 Favorite Song – "Heaven" (Kane Brown)

ARIA Awards 
(presented in Sydney on November 28, 2018)
 Best Country Album – Campfire (Kasey Chambers)
 ARIA Hall of Fame – Kasey Chambers

Billboard Music Awards 
(presented in Las Vegas on May 20, 2018)
 Top Country Artist – Chris Stapleton
 Top Male Country Artist – Chris Stapleton
 Top Female Country Artist – Maren Morris
 Top Country Duo/Group – Florida Georgia Line
 Top Country Album – From A Room: Volume 1 (Chris Stapleton)
 Top Country Song – "Body Like a Back Road" (Zach Crowell, Sam Hunt, Shane McAnally, Josh Osborne)
 Top Country Tour – Huntin', Fishin' and Lovin' Every Day Tour (Luke Bryan)

CMT Awards
(presented on June 7, 2018, in Nashville)
 Video of the Year – "I'll Name the Dogs" (Blake Shelton)
 Male Video of the Year – "I'll Name the Dogs" (Blake Shelton)
 Female Video of the Year – "The Champion" (Carrie Underwood ft. Ludacris)
 Duo Video of the Year – "Tequila" (Dan + Shay)
 Group Video of the Year – "When Someone Stops Loving You" (Little Big Town)
 Breakthrough Video of the Year – "Every Little Thing" (Carly Pearce)
 Collaborative Video of the Year – "What Ifs" (Kane Brown ft. Lauren Alaina)
 CMT Performance of the Year – "Everybody" (Backstreet Boys and Florida Georgia Line) from CMT Crossroads

CMT Artists of the Year
 (presented on October 17, 2019, in Nashville)
Kelsea Ballerini
Karen Fairchild
Miranda Lambert
Maren Morris
Kimberley Schlapman
Hillary Scott
Carrie Underwood
Artist of a Lifetime: Shania Twain

Country Music Association Awards
(presented on November 15, 2018, in Nashville)
 Entertainer of the Year – Keith Urban
 Male Vocalist of the Year – Chris Stapleton
 Female Vocalist of the Year – Carrie Underwood
 New Artist of the Year – Luke Combs
 Vocal Duo of the Year – Brothers Osborne
 Vocal Group of the Year – Old Dominion
 Musician of the Year – Mac McAnally
 Single of the Year – "Broken Halos" (Chris Stapleton)
 Song of the Year – "Broken Halos" (Mike Henderson, Chris Stapleton)
 Album of the Year – Golden Hour (Kacey Musgraves)
 Musical Event of the Year – "Everything's Gonna Be Alright (David Lee Murphy and Kenny Chesney)
 Music Video of the Year – "Marry Me" (Thomas Rhett)
 International Artist Achievement Award – Little Big Town
 Global Artist Achievement Award – Dean Brody (Canada)

Grammy Awards 
(presented in Los Angeles on February 10, 2019)
 Album of the Year – Golden Hour (Kacey Musgraves)
 Best Country Solo Performance – "Butterflies" (Kacey Musgraves)
 Best Country Duo/Group Performance – "Tequila" (Dan + Shay)
 Best Country Song – "Space Cowboy" (Luke Laird, Shane McAnally, Kacey Musgraves)
 Best Country Album – Golden Hour (Kacey Musgraves)
 Best Bluegrass Album – The Travelin' McCourys (The Travelin' McCourys)
 Best Americana Album – By the Way, I Forgive You (Brandi Carlile)
 Best American Roots Performance – "The Joke" (Brandi Carlile)
 Best American Roots Song – "The Joke" (Brandi Carlile, Dave Cobb, Phil Hanseroth, Tim Hanseroth)
 Best Roots Gospel Album – Unexpected (Jason Crabb)

International Bluegrass Music Association Awards 
(presented on September 27, 2018)
 Entertainer of the Year – Balsam Range
 Male Vocalist of the Year – Buddy Melton
 Female Vocalist of the Year – Brooke Aldridge
 Vocal Group of the Year – Doyle Lawson & Quicksilver
 Instrumental Group of the Year – The Travelin' McCourys
 Emerging Artist of the Year – The Po' Ramblin' Boys
 Guitar Player of the Year – Molly Tuttle
 Banjo Player of the Year – Ned Luberecki
 Mandolin Player of the Year – Sierra Hull
 Fiddle Player of the Year – Michael Cleveland
 Bass Player of the Year – Tim Surrett
 Dobro Player of the Year – Justin Moses
 Album of the Year – Rivers & Roads (The Special Consensus)
 Song of the Year – "If I'd Have Wrote That Song" (Larry Cordle, Larry Shell, James Silvers)
 Recorded Event of the Year – "Swept Away" (Missy Raines with Alison Brown, Becky Buller, Sierra Hull and Molly Tuttle)
 Instrumental Recorded Performance of the Year – "Squirrel Hunters" (The Special Consensus with John Hartford, Rachel Baiman, Christian Sedelmyer and Alison Brown)
 Gospel Recorded Performance of the Year – "Speakin' To That Mountain" (Becky Buller)

Juno Awards 
(presented in London on March 16–17, 2019)
 Country Album of the Year – We Were That Song (Brett Kissel)
 Contemporary Roots Album of the Year – Both Ways (Donovan Woods)
 Traditional Roots Album of the Year – Sweet Old Religion (Pharis and Jason Romero)
 Breakthrough Group of the Year – The Washboard Union
 Recording Engineer of the Year – Shawn Everett (Golden Hour)

See also
 Country Music Association
 Inductees of the Country Music Hall of Fame

References

Country
Country music by year
Culture-related timelines by year